Nordre Puttjern is a lake in Østmarka in Oslo, Norway.

The lake was almost entirely dried up in 1997 due to a leak during the construction of the railway tunnel Romeriksporten.

References

Lakes of Oslo